The Turkish Sailing Federation (TYF) is the national governing body for the sport of sailing in Turkey, recognised by the International Sailing Federation.

Following sailboard and boat classes are officially registered by the federation:
420
470
Dragon
Europe
Finn
Laser
Mistral One Design
Optimist
Pirate
Yacht
Radio-controlled racing sailboat

Famous sailors
See :Category:Turkish sailors

Olympic sailing
See :Category:Olympic sailors of Turkey

Offshore sailing
Nazlı Çağla Dönertaş (born 1991), 2012 Olympic qualified female yachtracer

Yacht clubs
See :Category:Yacht clubs in Turkey

References

External links
 Official website
 ISAF MNA Microsite

Sports organizations established in 1957
Turkey
Sailing
Yachting associations
Sailing governing bodies
1957 establishments in Turkey
Sailing in Turkey
Organizations based in Istanbul